Malekhiv is a village in Lviv Raion of Lviv Oblast located at a distance of  northeast of the city of Lviv. Malekhiv belongs to Lviv urban hromada, one of the hromadas of Ukraine.

Local government — Malekhivska village council. 

Through the village passes Highway M06 (Ukraine).

History 
The first mention of the village of Malekhiv in historical documents refers to 1377. But Ancient people have lived in territory of village Malekhiv in the first century AD.

History of the name — Malechow (Lemberg Umgebung), Galicia, Austria; later Malechów (Lwów), Lwów, Poland; now Malekhiv, Zhovkva, L′viv, Ukraine.

Until 18 July 2020, Malekhiv belonged to Zhovkva Raion. The raion was abolished in July 2020 as part of the administrative reform of Ukraine, which reduced the number of raions of Lviv Oblast to seven. The area of Zhovkva Raion was merged into Lviv Raion.

Religious communities 
In the village there are  three  religious communities. This religious community of the Ukrainian Greek Catholic Church, the Roman Catholic Church and Religious Communities Ukrainian Orthodox Autocephalous Church. 

There has church Cathedral of the Most Holy Theotokos, which belongs to the Greek Catholic community (the temple was built in 1892), and Catholic church of St. Archangel Michael (was built in 70 years of the 18th century).

References

External links 
 Малехів - костел св.Архистратига Михаїла 
 «Churches and Chapels of Ukraine»   
 MALECHÓW. Kościół p.w. św. Michała Archanioła  

Villages in Lviv Raion